in organic chemistry, vinylation is the process of attaching a vinyl group to a substrate.  Many organic compounds contain vinyl groups, so the process has attracted significant interest, especially since the reaction scope includes substituted vinyl groups.  The reactions can be classified according to the source of the vinyl group.

Nucleophilic vinyl reagents
Vinyl lithium and vinyl magnesium bromide are sources of "", which add to ketones and aldehydes. Vinylsiloxane and vinylboranes have also been used as sources of vinyl anion equivalents.These types of reactions require catalysts such as those based on palladium.

Vinylation with alkenes
The Heck reaction couples an unsaturated halide with an alkene.  Base and a palladium catalyst are required.  This reaction is a way to substitute alkenes.

In hydrovinylation, ethylene adds "across" an alkene double bond:

This kind of reaction requires a metal catalyst. In principle, alkenes other than ethylene could be employed.

In a stoichiometric version of a hydrovinylation reaction, nucleophiles add to an electrophilic transition metal alkene complex, forming a C-C bond.  The resulting metal alkyl undergoes beta-hydride elimination, liberating the vinylated product.

Vinylation with acetylene
As originally developed by Walter Reppe, acetylene participates in a variety of metal- or base-catalyzed reaction to afford vinyl derivatives. Alcohols, thiols, and secondary amines add to acetylene to give the vinyl ethers, vinyl sulfides, and vinyl amines, respectively.

In the presence of metal catalysts, carbon monoxide and acetylene react to give acrylic acid or acrylic esters. The net reaction is vinylation of carbon monoxide.

Vinyl acetate
The preparation of vinyl esters typically requires indirect methods because vinyl alcohol is not a suitable reagent.  Vinyl acetate, which is available on an industrial scale, can be used to produce other vinyl esters.  The process is sometimes referred to as transvinylation.  Higher esters of vinyl acetate have been used in the synthesis of vinyl formate.

Alternatively, vinyl ethers can be prepared from alcohols by iridium-catalyzed transesterification of vinyl esters, especially the widely available vinyl acetate:
ROH + CH2=CHOAc → ROCH=CH2 + HOAc

References

Vinyl compounds
Vinyl esters